The Pacifist is a 1970 Italian-French-German drama film directed by Miklós Jancsó.

Cast 

 Monica Vitti as Barbara
 Pierre Clémenti as  "The Stranger"
 Peter Pasetti as  Commissioner
  Piero Faggioni as  Piero
  Gino Lavagetto as  Carlo

References

External links

1970 films
1970 drama films
French drama films
Italian drama films
West German films
Films directed by Miklós Jancsó
1970s French films
1970s Italian films